Betchworth Quarry and Lime Kilns is a   nature reserve north of Betchworth in Surrey. Betchworth Quarry only is managed by Surrey Wildlife Trust.  It is part of the Mole Gap to Reigate Escarpment Site of Special Scientific Interest and Special Area of Conservation.

This chalk downlands site is part of the North Downs and the Surrey Hills Area of Outstanding Natural Beauty. It has a rich variety of flowering plants, including orchids. The lime kilns house a variety of bat species, such as the whiskered, Natterer's, brown long-eared, Brandt's and Daubenton's.

History 
Chalk has been quarried on a small scale in the area around Dorking since at least the 1600s. In 1865 the Dorking Greystone Lime Company was incorporated to open a large quarry at Betchworth. A standard gauge siding was laid from Betchworth railway station to the lime kilns built at the foot of the North Downs escarpment.

References

Surrey Wildlife Trust
Box Hill, Surrey